Norbelto Irenes Jiménez Lorenzo (born 26 February 1991) is a Dominican professional boxer. He is a two-time world title challenger, having fought for the WBA super-flyweight title in 2014 and 2019.

Boxing career
Jimenez made his professional debut against Juan Pichardo on 25 February 2010. He lost the fight by majority decision. Despite beginning his career with a 1–7 run, Jimenez would amass an 18–8–2 record during the next four years, before being booked to face Julio Escudero for the vacant WBA Fedelatin super flyweight title on 28 June 2014. He won the fight by unanimous decision, with scores of 109–100, 108–102 and 109–100.

After successfully defending the Dominican super flyweight title, which he won with a third-round stoppage of Esteban Aquino on 2 February 2014, against Aneudy Matos on 21 September 2014, Jimenez challenged the reigning WBA World super flyweight champion Kohei Kono on 31  December 2014. Kano retained the title by split decision. One judge scored the fight 116–111 for Kano, the second scored it 115–112 for Jimenez, while the third judge scored the bout an even 114–114.

Following his first failed title bid, Jimenez faced Jesus Vargas on 18 April 2015, back in his native Santo Domingo. He won the fight by unanimous decision, with all three judges awarding him all ten rounds of the bout. Jimenez won his next eight successive bouts, before being booked to challenge the WBA super flyweight title Kal Yafai on 29 June 2019, at the Dunkin' Donuts Center in Providence, Ohio, on the undercard of the Demetrius Andrade and Maciej Sulecki middleweight title bout. Jimenez suffered his first loss in eight years, as he lost the fight by unanimous decision, with scores of 117–109, 119–107 and 118–108.

Jimenez challenged the WBC International super flyweight champion Aliu Bamidele Lasisi on 6 March 2020, in the main event of an ESPN+ broadcast card. The fight was ruled a split decision draw, with scores of 95–95, 96–94 and 94–96. Jimenez faced Marvin Solano, in his second and final fight of the year, on 17 December 2020. He won the fight by unanimous decision, with scores of 79–72, 79–72 and 78–73.

Jimenez faced the former four-weight world champion Donnie Nietes in a WBO super-flyweight title eliminator on 11 December 2021. Aside from a title shot, Nietes' WBO International super-flyweight belt was on the line as well. The fight was ruled a split decision draw, with scores of 96–94, 94–96 and 95–95. Jimenez faced the former WBA super-flyweight title challenger Keyvin Lara (31–4–1) on 8 April 2022. He won the fight by unanimous decision, with scores of 97–93, 98–92 and 97–93. 

Jimenez was booked to face the former WBA (Regular) super-flyweight titleholder Andrew Moloney on 16 October 2022. He lost the fight by unanimous decision.

Professional boxing record

References

1991 births
Living people
Dominican Republic male boxers
Sportspeople from Santo Domingo
Super-flyweight boxers
Bantamweight boxers
Super-bantamweight boxers